Raymond D. Tremblay (born in Timmins, Ontario) graduated with a Masters in Social Work from Carleton University in 1969.  He is a writer of Métis origin.  With a strong affinity to social welfare issues, he currently works at the Shepherds of Good Hope in Ottawa, Ontario.

Professional career

In his early years Raymond worked for the Porcupine & District Children’s Aid Society (1965–1971).  However, in 1971 he accepted many executive positions with provincial and municipal organizations:

Ontario Ministry of Health and Long-Term Care (1971–1976) - Director of Social Work - Northeastern Regional Mental Health Centre
Timmins Association for the Mentally Retarded – Program Coordinator (1976–1977)
Ontario Ministry of Health (1977–1989) – Director of Social Work Services – Kingston Psychiatric Hospital
Ontario Ministry of Health (1989–1998) – Coordinator of Community Development – Kingston Psychiatric Hospital
Ontario College of Certified Social Workers – Chairman (1990–1993).
Ontario Ministry of Municipal Affairs and Housing – Advisor (1998)

Awards

Appointed the First Honorary Member of the Board of Directors of the Kingston Branch of the Canadian Mental Health Association (1984)
Distinguished Service Award from the Ontario Division of the Canadian Mental Health Association (1985)
In-Appreciation Award from the Kingston Branch of the Canadian Mental Health Association (1992)
In-Appreciation Award from the Timmins Branch of the Ontario Association of Social Workers (1992)
In-Appreciation Award from the Kingston Branch of Ontario Association of Social Workers (1993)

Career as a Writer

Raymond has self-published thirty-seven collections of poetry on the homeless, volunteers working with the homeless and a wide range of other topics. His earlier collections "We Salute You - Vol. IV - Nous Vous Saluons" is a pictorial and poetic tribute to those individuals and groups who volunteer at the Shepherds of Good Hope.  He has collaborated on the publication of two booklets: "The Call to Peggy’s Cove" and "The Innovator".  He has co-authored a novel about street people titled, "Remember Who I Am".  He has also written two other manuscripts "On a Mission with Queensway Tours" and "Where to Next".

Published works

'The Closing of Northeastern Regional Mental Health Centre: A Plea for Leadership', O.A.P.S.W. Newsmagazine, December 1975, Volume 3, Number 4 (pp 58 – 59).
'Housing Needs - A Survey of Inpatients at the Kingston Psychiatric Hospital', The Social Worker, 1984, Volume 52, Number 4, (pp 163 – 166).
'Quality Review Monitors Front-Line Worker's Performance', O.A.P.S.W. Newsmagazine, February 1985, (pp 12 and 15).
'Here Are More Reasons Why The Social Work Profession Must Organize to Seek Regulating Legislation', O.A.P.S.W. Newsmagazine, January 1986, Volume 12, Number 6 (pp 5 – 6).
'Community Development: An Integral Part of Discharge Planning', Canadian Association of Social Work Administrators in Health Facilities Newsletter, September 1997.
'Developing a Wider Range of Housing Options for the Mentally Ill', O.A.P.S.W. Newsmagazine, October 1987, Volume 14, Number 3.
'Farmer Fred - Accepting, Instead of Contradicting', Geriatric Nursing, September/October 1991, co-authored with Ken Gies.
'Developing Community and Hospital Partnerships: Fledgling Relationships Built on Mutual Trust, Presence and Commitment', What Works!  Innovation in Community Mental Health and Addiction Treatment Programs, Canadian Scholars' Press Inc., March 1993.
'Constructive Grief', a book review of 'Grieving Mental Illness' published in Leadership in Health Services (January/February/96) of the Canadian Health Care Association.
Published a second novel, 'Riding the Tides of Life', Ottawa: Budd Publishing, 2010.

References

External links
 Kingston Branch of the Canadian Mental Health Association
 Ontario Ministry of Health
 Metis Nations of Ontario
 Shepherds of Good Hope

Year of birth missing (living people)
Living people
20th-century Canadian poets
Canadian male poets
Writers from Timmins
Canadian Métis people
Métis writers
20th-century Canadian male writers